Thalassomonas haliotis  is a heterotrophic bacterium from the genus of Thalassomonas which has been isolated from marine animals.

References

External links
Type strain of Thalassomonas haliotis at BacDive -  the Bacterial Diversity Metadatabase

 

Alteromonadales
Bacteria described in 2009